"Heart on My Sleeve" is a song written and originally recorded by Gallagher & Lyle in 1976. It was the second hit from their Breakaway album.  The song reached the top ten in the UK, and was a US and UK hit for Bryan Ferry that same year from his Let's Stick Together LP.

Chart history

Gallagher & Lyle

Weekly Charts 
Single chart usages for Ireland2
Single chart called without artist

Year-end Charts

Bryan Ferry

Other versions
 Ringo Starr covered "Heart on My Sleeve" on his 1978 album Bad Boy.

References

External links
 
 

1976 songs
1976 singles
Songs written by Benny Gallagher
Songs written by Graham Lyle
Gallagher and Lyle songs
Atlantic Records singles
A&M Records singles
Bryan Ferry songs
Ringo Starr songs